Jarno Sebastian Elg (born 1975) is a Finnish Satanist who was sentenced to life in prison for murdering a 23-year-old man, eating some of the body parts and instigating others to participate in a ritual that included torturing the victim while listening to songs from The Cainian Chronicle, an album by the Norwegian black metal band Ancient, on November 21, 1998, in Hyvinkää. Elg's accomplices were the 17-year-old Terhi Johanna Tervashonka from Järvenpää, a 20-year-old man from Mäntsälä and a 16-year-old boy from Kerava.

Jarno Elg was captured by the police and sentenced to life in prison. The accomplices Terhi Johanna Tervashonka and Mika Kristian Riska were respectively sentenced to eight years and six months and two years and eight months in prison by The Hyvinkää District Court in southern Finland. It was said that the three people "were strongly influenced by Satanism". The court declared most of the details of the case to be sealed for 40 years. For this reason, only a limited amount of information is available.

The criminal investigation started when a leg was found from a dump site, thus giving the name "dump site murder" to the case. The case was generally described as the most gruesome homicide in Finnish history.

After the sentences, the media "tried to raise up Black Metal as a scapegoat for the happenings in Hyvinkää". Demonos Sova of Barathrum "tried his very best not to involve Black Metal and Satanism with the murder" and called the murderers "some nutcases", whereas the I Return to Darkness fanzine "fully supports the murder of Hyvinkää and would like to hail in honour all those who participated in it". An article printed by the Norwegian Slayer fanzine stated that "[i]t's amazing how Satanists are always so full of strength and never forget to remind us that the weak must be weeded out., yet when someone does actually weed out some weak hypocrite - they are the first to mourn in public to save their precious Satanism from the terrible Devil Worshippers who ruin the whole name and essence of Satan which actions that, of course, don't have anything to do with 'real' Satanism", and told Sova to "[f]uck off and die". The article also questions why some people within the scene were "so fucking protective concerning Black Metal's 'good reputation'" although "Black Metal was the only form of 'music' where the music itself doesn't come as the first priority", whereas musicians now would seem to "care more about their guitars than the actual essence onto which the whole concept was and is based upon". In Metalion: The Slayer Mag Diaries, the fanzine's author Metalion stated that it was a "stupid article" and people gave him "lots of shit for printing the article, especially because the point of view tended to support the attackers".

In an interview given in 2000, Tervashonka explained that she did not consider the case murder. She said that she and her friends, completely intoxicated, had tied and silenced another member of the group who had become noisy by using a duct tape without understanding that he would die of suffocation as a result. Tervashonka denied that the case had been related to devil worship.

The Helsinki Court of Appeal granted Elg parole in December 2014.

References

1975 births
Living people
20th-century Finnish criminals
Finnish male criminals
Crimes involving Satanism or the occult
Cannibals
Finnish criminals
Finnish prisoners sentenced to life imprisonment
Prisoners sentenced to life imprisonment by Finland
Finnish people convicted of murder
People convicted of murder by Finland
People paroled from life sentence
Finnish Satanists
Black metal